Amanda Filipacchi (born October 10, 1967) is an American novelist. She was born in Paris and educated in both in France and in the U.S. She is the author of four novels, Nude Men (1993), Vapor (1999), Love Creeps (2005), and The Unfortunate Importance of Beauty (2015). Her fiction has been translated into 13 languages.

Early life and education
Filipacchi was born in Paris, and was educated in France (where she attended the American School of Paris in St. Cloud) and in the U.S. She is the daughter of former model Sondra Peterson and Daniel Filipacchi, chairman emeritus of Hachette Filipacchi Médias. She has been writing since the age of thirteen and completed three unpublished novels in her teenage years. She has been living in New York since she was 17. She attended Hamilton College, from which she graduated with a BA in Creative Writing. At age 20, she tried her hand at non-fiction writing at Rolling Stone magazine. In 1990, Filipacchi enrolled in Columbia University's MFA fiction writing program, where she wrote a master's thesis which she later turned into her first published novel, Nude Men.

Career
In 1992, when Filipacchi was 24, a time shortly before her graduation, her agent, Melanie Jackson, sold Nude Men to Nan Graham at Viking Press. The novel was later translated into  ten languages and was anthologized in The Best American Humor 1994 (published by Simon & Schuster).

Filipacchi's second and third novels, Vapor (1999) and Love Creeps (2005, a novel about obsessive love and stalking respectively), were also translated into multiple languages. In 2005, Filipacchi was invited to participate in the 2005 Saint-Amour literary festival, a 10-city tour through Belgium.
 
Reviewers have called Filipacchi "a prodigious postfeminist talent", and a "lovely comic surrealist". The Boston Globe described her writing style as "reminiscent in certain ways of Muriel Spark ... brisk, witty, knowing, mischievous." Love Creeps (referred to in a review by Alexis Soloski in The Village Voice as having "oddball situations and merrily acidic dialogue") was one of The Village Voice'''s top 25 books of the year, and was included in the syllabus of a course on the comic novel in Columbia University's graduate creative writing program.

In August 2013, Filipacchi sold her latest novel, The Unfortunate Importance of Beauty, to Norton. According to the publisher, the novel deals with two women going to elaborate lengths to find love. It was named on Bustle's list of "12 of the Most Anticipated Books of 2015, aka the Titles We Can't Get Our Hands On Soon Enough" and the Huffington Post's "2015 Books We Can't Wait To Read".

Wikipedia op-ed

In an April 2013 op-ed for The New York Times, Filipacchi expressed concerns about sexism regarding Wikipedia's classification of American novelists, as well as female novelists from other countries, after she noticed multiple editors moving female writers out of the general category of "American novelists" and into a subcategory for "American women novelists". She described it as a "small, easily fixable thing ... that make[s] it harder and slower for women to gain equality in the literary world", and added that "[p]eople who go to Wikipedia to get ideas for whom to hire, or honor, or read, and look at that list of 'American Novelists' for inspiration ... might simply use that list without thinking twice about it." The op-ed spurred an outcry from feminists and other commentators, who echoed her concerns about sexism and the perceived minimization of female novelists on the site. Filipacchi stated in a follow-up piece that editors had targeted her Wikipedia biography page in retaliation for her criticism. Andrew Leonard of Salon described this as "revenge editing" and supported his description of the event by quoting combative remarks about Filipacchi made by the primary user involved, who was later revealed to be writer Robert Clark Young.

Filipacchi later wrote an additional article in The Atlantic, rebutting media stories that attributed the recategorization of female novelists to the work of a single editor, and listed seven different users who were responsible for recategorizing the seventeen women writers mentioned in her op-ed. In July 2013, she wrote a personal essay for The Wall Street Journal,'' which more humorously described the aftermath of the controversy, discussing how she became engrossed in discussions on Wikipedia and criticism site Wikipediocracy.

Works

Books

Other publications

References

External links

Living people
Hamilton College (New York) alumni
Columbia University School of the Arts alumni
1967 births
Amanda
French people of Italian descent

Postmodern writers
Magic realism writers
Writers from New York City
Writers from Paris

20th-century American novelists
21st-century American novelists
American women novelists
20th-century French novelists
21st-century French novelists
French women novelists
Critics of Wikipedia
20th-century American women writers
21st-century American women writers
Novelists from New York (state)
20th-century French women
21st-century French women